FC Cincinnati is a soccer club based in Cincinnati, Ohio that began play in 2016 in the competition then known as the United Soccer League and now as the USL Championship. The team was announced on August 12, 2015. The club's ownership group was led by Carl H. Lindner III.

On May 29, 2018, Major League Soccer awarded an expansion team to the FC Cincinnati ownership group. The MLS team began play under the FC Cincinnati name in 2019.

History 

In May 2015, rumors of a new USL club in Cincinnati were reported by the media. There was speculation regarding the relationship the team would have with the Cincinnati Bengals, as well as a former Cincinnati soccer club, the Cincinnati Kings, as Jeff Berding was named as part of the ownership group. Berding was employed by the Bengals and on the board of the youth soccer club Kings-Hammer FC. The Lindner family, of American Financial Group which is headquartered in Cincinnati, was reported as the owner of the new team with Carl Lindner III representing the owners at the press conference.

Then on August 12, 2015, FC Cincinnati announced that John Harkes would coach the new club and that the club would play in Nippert Stadium on the campus of the University of Cincinnati.

On April 16, 2016, FC Cincinnati broke the USL attendance record for a game, with 20,497 in attendance for the rivalry game against Louisville City FC, and, on May 14, against another rival Pittsburgh Riverhounds, broke its own record with 23,375 in attendance. On September 17, 2016, the team broke the USL record again, when they drew 24,376 for their game against Orlando City B. The team broke its own USL record once again on August 5, 2017, when they drew 25,308 for their game against Orlando City B.

On July 16, 2016, FC Cincinnati set the record for highest attendance at a soccer match in the state of Ohio when 35,061 people came for an exhibition game against Crystal Palace.

On October 2, 2016, FC Cincinnati hosted their first ever playoff match against Charleston Battery, losing 2–1 in the quarterfinals of the 2016 USL playoffs. In the process, the club broke the playoff and single-game attendance record at 30,187.

On June 14, 2017, FC Cincinnati played their first match against a Major League Soccer team, Columbus Crew SC, during the Lamar Hunt U.S. Open Cup. Cincinnati won 1–0, with player Baye Djiby Fall scoring the only goal of the game. In the process, Cincinnati broke the attendance record for the U.S. Open Cup Fourth Round with 30,160 tickets sold, only 5,000 behind their club attendance record of 35,061.

On June 28, 2017, FC Cincinnati played their second match against a Major League Soccer team, Chicago Fire, in the Round of 16 during the Lamar Hunt U.S. Open Cup. Cincinnati would prevail 3–1 on penalty kicks after a 0–0 draw, with goalkeeper Mitch Hildebrandt stopping three of four penalty kicks. He totaled 10 saves during the match. The attendance of 32,287 was the second largest Modern Era crowd in U.S. Open Cup history. The match was televised nationally on ESPN.

On August 15, 2017, FC Cincinnati were defeated at home in front of a sold-out crowd by the New York Red Bulls 3–2 in the US Open Cup semi-final. FCC was leading 2–0 in the second half before eventually losing in extra time.

On April 7, 2018, the club set the USL attendance record for a home opener at 25,667 in a 1–0 loss to rival Louisville City.

On September 29, 2018, the club broke the USL attendance record once again in its final regular-season home match before its MLS move, drawing in 31,478 in a 3–0 win over rival Indy Eleven.

MLS expansion bid 

The club began negotiations with Major League Soccer over a potential expansion franchise in early 2016, and Cincinnati was announced as one of ten cities that had expressed interest in the slots for teams 25 to 28. MLS Commissioner Don Garber visited Cincinnati in December 2016 to tour Nippert Stadium and meet with city and club officials, complimenting the city and its fans. FC Cincinnati formally submitted its expansion bid in January 2017, including a shortlist of potential stadium locations.

On May 29, 2018, Major League Soccer announced that FC Cincinnati would join the league in 2019 as an expansion team. A stadium in the West End with a planned capacity of about 26,000 was scheduled to open in 2021. TQL Stadium opened in May, 2021. Their first game against Inter Miami had only 6,000 fans in attendance due to the coronavirus pandemic restrictions.

Team colors and crest 
The team's primary colors were orange and blue, which were also used as a nickname for the team. The crest was a simple shield with a crown and the winged lion of Saint Mark the Evangelist holding a sword and a soccer ball. The colors and crests originated with the Dayton Dutch Lions, the team's launch partner.

Stadium 

FC Cincinnati played home matches at Nippert Stadium on the campus of the University of Cincinnati, also home to the school's football team. The stadium was designed for American football and underwent a minor renovation in 2016 to accommodate the soccer team, a few months after the completion of a major renovation by the football team. FC Cincinnati limited stadium capacity for USL matches to approximately 25,000 with upper level sections covered. The "Bailey" was the official supporters section in Nippert, with a capacity of 1,700 and regular displays of flags, tifos, and colored smoke. Other sections of the stadium catered towards casual fans and families, including sections with bleachers seating and club seating.

On June 26, 2018, the club announced plans to build a training complex in Milford, Ohio. The facility is also expected to host between 6 and 20 soccer-related events a year, including first-team scrimmages, FCC Academy games and local soccer tournaments. The complex was completed by the end of 2019.

TQL Stadium, called West End Stadium during construction, is a soccer-specific stadium in Cincinnati, Ohio. It is the home of FC Cincinnati, a Major League Soccer team that had been temporarily playing at Nippert Stadium. Ground was broken for construction in December, 2018. TQL Stadium opened in May, 2021 and has a seating capacity of 26,000.

Ownership and team management 

Former Cincinnati Bengals executive Jeff Berding was the president and general manager. The CEO and majority owner of the team is Carl Lindner III, CEO of American Financial Group. The club's ownership group also included Chris Lindner (Carl III's son), David L. Thompson, Jeff Berding, Scott Farmer, Steve Hightower, George Joseph, Mike Mossel (who is an owner of the Dayton Dutch Lions), and Jack Wyant.

FC Cincinnati introduced former MLS player John Harkes as its first head coach on August 12, 2015. Harkes was relieved of his coaching duties in February 2017 and replaced by assistant coach and scouting director Alan Koch.

Supporters and club culture 

FC Cincinnati became the most supported lower-tier soccer club in the United States, setting the USL record by averaging 21,199 in attendance in the 2017 season.

FC Cincinnati had six sanctioned supporters groups that represented different areas and cultures of the tri-state region and sat in the north-side supporters area in "The Bailey", a de facto standing section. The "German-themed" Die Innenstadt was based on Cincinnati's "inner city" neighborhoods including Downtown and Over-the-Rhine. Die Innenstadt hosted its match day activities at Mecklenburg Gardens and watched away matches at Rhinehaus OTR. Die Innenstadt kicked off every match with a supporters march from Mecklenburg up University Avenue and marched into the south side of Nippert Stadium. The Pride was the oldest supporters group, founded before the club was announced in August 2015, and was based at Ladder 19. Smaller groups were based on various common interests: The Den was a supporter's group geared towards families; The Legion was composed mostly of college-age members from the local universities; Lowen Des Sudens was made of members from Northern Kentucky; the Queen City Firm consisted mainly of supporters from Cincinnati's west side.

Rivalries

River Cities Cup 

During FC Cincinnati's USL tenure, its main league and regional rival was Louisville City FC, located a mere 100 miles southwest of Cincinnati along the Ohio River. The two clubs competed annually for the River Cities Cup in what was known to locals as "The Dirty River Derby". The rivalry became one of the best-attended and most hotly-contested matchups in lower division US soccer.

The cities' two main universities (Louisville and Cincinnati) had a long-standing football rivalry and basketball rivalry that ended in 2013 due to conference realignment. Both teams went 1–1–1 against each other in each of the first two seasons of the rivalry (2016 and 2017), with Cincinnati taking the cup home in 2016 and Louisville City doing so in 2017, both on aggregate. Louisville City retained the trophy in 2018 by winning the first two of the teams' three regular-season matches.

Other rivalries 

The Pittsburgh Riverhounds are located less than 290 miles away and were formerly the second closest USL team from Cincinnati. This rivalry developed from the rivalry between the NFL's Cincinnati Bengals and Pittsburgh Steelers. In the first-ever meeting between the two clubs, the Riverhounds-FC Cincinnati match set a then-USL record crowd of 23,375 fans. The May 14, 2016 match was dubbed an "Orange Out" and had Bengals players on the pitch before the match as honorary captains.

Cincinnati also had a rivalry with the Charlotte Independence, known as the Queen City Cup Challenge. The two "Queen-Cities" faced in the inaugural home match at Nippert Stadium for FC Cincinnati in April 2016.  Cincinnati would claim the rivalry cup in both the 2016 and 2017 seasons.

Cincinnati had a potential in-state rival in Major League Soccer's Columbus Crew. The Cincinnati USL team defeated Columbus Crew 1–0 in a 2017 U.S. Open Cup match known as "Hell Is Real" after a billboard on Interstate 71, the highway between Columbus and Cincinnati.

Media 

On February 23, 2016, FC Cincinnati announced ESPN 1530 as the Official Radio Partner for the organization. ESPN 1530 aired all of FCC's regular-season home matches. FC Cincinnati also penned an agreement with Moerlein Lager House to present all games live on TV.

On March 22, 2017, FC Cincinnati reached an agreement with Sinclair Broadcast Group to have WKRC-TV, WSTR-TV and CinCW 12.2 televise all home and away games, including playoff games. Nine games aired on WSTR, four on CinCW, and two on Local 12. Tom Gelehrter called play-by-play with Kevin McCloskey and Paul Rockwood as color analysts. Lindsay Patterson served as sideline reporter.

For the club's first two seasons, all live USL matches were live-streamed on YouTube. A few weeks into their third season, however, the USL reached an agreement with ESPN to make ESPN+ its official live-streaming service starting on April 12, 2018. USL matches remained accessible outside of the United States on YouTube.

FC Cincinnati broadcast its 2016 friendly against Crystal Palace live on Facebook. The broadcast also featured special Facebook Live 360-degree footage.

Former players and staff

Head coaches

Club captains

Honors 
 United Soccer League
 Regular season champions: 2018
 IMG Suncoast Pro Classic
 Champions: 2016
 River Cities Cup
 Champions: 2016
 Queen City Cup
 Champions: (2) 2016, 2017

Individual honors

Seasons and records

Year-by-year 

This is a complete list of seasons for the USL franchise. For a season-by-season history including the successor FC Cincinnati MLS franchise, see List of FC Cincinnati seasons.

1. Avg. attendance include statistics from league matches only.
2. Top goalscorer(s) includes all goals scored in League, League Playoffs, U.S. Open Cup, CONCACAF Champions League, FIFA Club World Cup, and other competitive continental matches.

International opponents

Sponsorship

References

External links 
 
 FC Cincinnati at USL Championship

Former USL Championship teams
FC Cincinnati (2016-18)
Lindner family
Association football clubs established in 2015
2015 establishments in Ohio
Association football clubs disestablished in 2018
2018 disestablishments in Ohio
Defunct soccer clubs in Ohio